The T'ang String Quartet (唐四重奏) is a Singapore-based classical string quartet that has played to critical acclaim. Formed in 1992, they are Singapore's first full-time professional chamber group. In April 2022, the Quartet opened their 30th Anniversary celebrations with a rousing performance at Victoria Concert Hall. The concert, Humble Beginnings, also formally introduced their new members, Han Oh (viola) and Wang Zihao (cello). The quartet's new incarnation made its debut with contrasting string quartets by Joseph Haydn and Alexander Borodin to no less fanfare.

To commemorate 30 years of music, the T'ang Quartet has lined up a series of programmes in 2022, including the launch of their coffee table book, Tang At 30, which will be released in July. It will be held in conjunction with T'ang Quartet's second edition two-day anniversary programme, Gift of Music, at the Esplanade Recital Studio. The quartet also headlined NAC-ExxonMobil Concert in the Gardens on July 30 at the Singapore Botanic Gardens' Heritage Festival 2022.

Biography 
The T’ang String Quartet comprises Ng Yu-Ying (1st violin), Ang Chek Meng (2nd violin), Han Oh (viola) and Wang Zihao (cello). The T'ang Quartet was formed in 1992 when the members (Ng, Ang, Leslie Tan, Lionel Tan) were still performers with Singapore Symphony Orchestra. Trained individually in America, China, London and Moscow, the Quartet was awarded a fellowship to work in the USA with Paul and Martha Katz, Norman Fischer, Kenneth Goldsmith and Sergui Luca at the Shepherd School of Music. After a two-year masters studies in Rice University as a pre-formed quartet, the T’ang Quartet began their professional career in 1999 with unanimity of purpose: to break new ground by extending the sheer fun and enjoyment of classical music to a larger audience, as well as setting new standards of artistic achievement.

Critics have praised the T’ang Quartet  as 'astounding' for its 'confidence', bravura and charisma' (Boston Globe) and for bringing ‘enthusiasm, energy and commitment...to all the music...' (The Times, London). They have added that 'this ensemble is outstanding. Unanimity of attack is uncanny, and intonation and internal balance both impress greatly. These are plainly minds which share a wavelength' (Evening Standard, London).

Apart from recitals the Quartet is also very active in outreach and art education programmes. The T’ang Quartet is currently the quartet-in-residence at the Yong Siew Toh Conservatory of Music at the National University of Singapore and was on the faculty of the Boston University Tanglewood Institute from 2001 to 2005.

In September 2006, it was accorded the prestigious honour of performing at the opening of Singapore Biennale, and to foreign dignitaries at the IMF and World Bank Annual Meetings held in Singapore. ASEAN Summit in 2007

"T'ang" signifies that golden age of the arts in Asia – the T'ang Dynasty. The name is also an acronym of the players' last names – Ng, Ang and Tan.

In 2007, T'ang Quartet premiered "Optical Identity", a collaborative production with Theatre Cryptic (Scotland) was commissioned by the Singapore Arts Festival. The European premiere took place at the Edinburgh International Festival in August, and the production then traveled to the Alicante International Contemporary Music Festival (Spain) in September, and tours Scotland in October and November 2007.

T'ang Quartet was invited to perform Azerbaijan composer Franghiz Ali Zadeh's Mugam Sayagi at a UNESCO award Ceremony in Paris on 3 April 2008, where she was receiving the honorary title of UNESCO Artist for Peace.

Members of T'ang Quartet play instruments on generous loan from the Rin Collection and Mr Jiri Heger.

Members 
 Ng Yu-Ying (born 1968), 1st violin
 Ang Chek Meng (born 1969), 2nd violin
 Han Oh (born 1974), viola
 Zihao Wang (born 1991), cello

Awards 
Winners – 2nd Internationaler Joseph Joachim Kammermusikwettbewerb (1999, Weimar, Germany)
Bartok Prize – Prague-Vienna-Budapest sommer Akademic (2000)
Cultural Award – Japanese Chamber of Commerce and Industry (2000)
Arts & Culture – Singapore Youth Award (SYA) 2002
Artistic Excellence Award (Classical)- presented by Composers and Authors Society of Singapore (2008)

Live concert recording album 
 Not Our Debut (T'ang Quartet and International Music Management, 1996)

Limited Release album 
 Heavenly (Action Theatre, 2001)

Album release 
 The Art of War (T'ang Quartet Limited, 2005)
 Made in America c.1893 (T'ang Quartet Limited, 2006) – featuring Violist Jiri Heger as guest soloist (Viola Quintet in E-flat, Op.97)
 "The True Sound of Healing" ( Produced by Tan Tock Seng Hospital,Singapore, 2008)

Other works 
 Recorded soundtrack for "Feet Unbound", a feature film retracing the Long March as undertaken by teenage girls, directed by Ng Khee Jin in 2006.
 A short film on " Optical Identity" featuring T'ang Quartet was screened at the Adelaide Film Festival in Feb 2009

References

External links 
Official Website

Singaporean musical groups
String quartets